LVN may refer to:

Licensed Vocational Nurse, see Licensed practical nurse
LVN Pictures, film studio
Airlake Airport in Minnesota, USA